North Kamrup violence was a series of violent activities in North Kamrup, Assam, on 4–5 January 1980 between those who supported the Assam Movement and those who opposed it.  Triggered by the death of a high school student, a member of the AASU, it led to a series of attacks and counter-attacks between Assamese and immigrant villages leading to a curfew. According to the Citizenship Rights Preservation Committee, representing Bengali speaking people, the violence was directed against linguistic, religio-linguistic, ethnic minorities and members of the CPI, CPI(M) and CPI(ML) political parties who opposed the Assam Movement. Many of the victims were Miya and it is alleged that the Army committed atrocities on Assamese villagers during the curfew. This was the first reported large-scale group clash during the Assam Movement.

Background 

In some districts of lower Assam, Bengali Hindus have experienced violence directed against on the linguistic and cultural identity of the Assamese people.

Assam has been churned in the cauldron of communal, ethnic, and state violence in the name of Assam Movement during 1979 to 1985. Some incidents of them are the North Kamrup pogrom of 1980 in which a large number of people belonging to the linguistic and religious minorities were massacred. 

Bengali speaking people were often harassed as foreigners and became the target of violence in the Carly phase of the anti-Bengali movement in Assam. At the beginning of the movement, many Muslim students of East Bengali origin supported and joined the movement. They were pretended themselves as Assamese speaker, called Na Asamiya. Although, after some years while Assamese speakers became the majority in Assam along with Muslims who pretended them as Assamese speaker, Assamese people started violence against Bengali speaker including Bengali Hindus. 
As soon as Muslim immigrants were diplomatically cheated by Assamese people and their community was targeted, they turned against anti-Bengali movement and slowly withdrew their support.

Violence and victimisation 
According to one version, on 3 January 1980, a group of students of Baganpara High School were visiting Barikadanga to supervise a three-day strike in response to a call given by the AASU for supporting the anti-Bengali movement. According to another version, the students went there to raise money for the anti-Bengali movement. The village of Barikadanga has a mixed Hindu and Muslim Bangalee population, most of whom are immigrants. They attacked the students as students were there for spreading anti-Bengali movement.

Read also 

 Bongal Kheda
 Goreswar massacre
 Mandai massacre

References 
Notes

Citations

Bibliography

 

1980 crimes in India
January 1980 events in Asia
1980s in Assam
Political violence in India
Massacres of Bengalis in Assam
Massacres of Bengalis